Margarella macquariensis is a species of marine gastropod mollusc in the family Trochidae, the top shells.

Description
The shell grows to a height of 11 mm; its diameter is also 11 mm.

Distribution
This marine species has only been found off the Macquarie Islands.

References

 Powell A. W. B., William Collins Publishers Ltd, Auckland 1979

External links
 

macquariensis
Gastropods of New Zealand
Gastropods described in 1916